Mzieme is a Sino-Tibetan language spoken in India. It has been called Northern Zeme due to its lack of official recognition, but is not particularly close to Zeme.

Mzieme is spoken to the northeast of Zeme in Peren district, southeastern Nagaland, as well as in Senapati district, Manipur.

References

Languages of Nagaland
Zeme languages
Endangered languages of India